IBM Power Systems is a family of server computers from IBM that are based on its Power processors. It was created in 2008 as a merger of the System p and System i product lines.

History 

IBM had two distinct POWER- and PowerPC-based hardware lines since the early 1990s:
 Servers running processors based on the IBM PowerPC-AS architecture in the AS/400 family (later known as iSeries, then System i) running OS/400 (later known as i5/OS, and now IBM i)
 Servers and workstations using POWER and PowerPC processors in the RS/6000 family (later known as pSeries, then System p), running IBM AIX and Linux on Power.

After the introduction of the POWER4 processor in 2001, there was little difference between both the "p" and the "i" hardware; the only differences were in the software and services offerings. With the introduction of the POWER5 processor in 2004, even the product numbering was synchronized. The System i5 570 was virtually identical to the System p5 570.

In April 2008, IBM officially merged the two lines of servers and workstations under the same name, Power, and later Power Systems, with identical hardware and a choice of operating systems, software, and service contracts, based formerly on a POWER6 architecture. The PowerPC line was discontinued.

With Release 8 of Red Hat Enterprise Linux, IBM has completed transition of POWER8 and POWER9 servers to little-endian mode for Linux. AIX and IBM i continue to run in big-endian mode.

Systems 
IBM Power Systems models:
 2008/2009
 BladeCenter JS12 Express
 BladeCenter JS22 Express
 BladeCenter JS23 Express
 BladeCenter JS43 Express
 Power 520 Express
 Power 550 Express
 Power 560 Express
 Power 570
 Power 575
 Power 595
 2010
 BladeCenter PS700 Express
 BladeCenter PS701 Express
 BladeCenter PS702 Express
 Power 710/730 Express (8231-E2B) (1~2 4, 6 or 8-core POWER7 CPUs)
 Power 720 Express (8202-E4B) (4, 6 or 8-core POWER7 CPU)
 Power 740 Express (8205-E6B) (1~2 4, 6 or 8-core POWER7 CPUs)
 Power 750 Express (8233-E8B) (1~4 6 or 8-core POWER7 CPUs)
 Power 755 (8236-E8C) (4 8-core POWER7 CPUs) for high-performance computing (HPC)
 Power 770
 Power 780
 Power 795
 2011
 Power 710 Express (8231-E1C) (4, 6 or 8-core POWER7 CPU)
 Power 720 Express (8202-E4C) (4, 6 or 8-core POWER7 CPU)
 Power 730 Express (8231-E2C) (2 4, 6 or 8-core POWER7 CPUs)
 Power 740 Express (8205-E6C) (1~2 4, 6 or 8-core POWER7 CPUs)
 Power 775 also known as PERCS
 2012
 Flex System p260
 Flex System p460
 Flex System p24L (Linux only)
 2013
 Power 710 Express (8231-E1D) (4, 6 or 8-core POWER7+ CPU)
 Power 720 Express (8202-E4D) (4, 6 or 8-core POWER7+ CPU)
 Power 730 Express (8231-E2D) (2 6 or 8-core POWER7+ CPUs)
 Power 740 Express (8205-E6D) (1~2 6 or 8-core POWER7+ CPUs)
 Power 750 Express (8408-E8D) (1~4 8-core POWER7+ DCMs)
 Power 760 (9109-RMD) (1~4 12-core POWER7+ DCMs)
 2014 
 Power Systems S821LC and S821LC
 Power Systems S822 and S822L
 Power Systems S814
 Power Systems S824 and S824L
 Power Systems E870
 Power Systems E880
 2015
 Power Systems E850
 Power Systems S812L and S812LC
 Power Systems S822LC
 2017
 Power Systems AC922
 Power Systems LC922
 Power Systems IC922
 Power Systems L922
 Power Systems S914
 Power Systems S922
 Power Systems S924
 Power Systems H922
 Power Systems H924
 Power Systems E950
 Power Systems E980
 2021
 Power E1080
 2022
 Power S1014
 Power S1022s
 Power S1022
 Power S1024

IBM PowerVM provides the virtualisation solution for Power Systems servers.

See also 

 IBM BladeCenter
 PureSystems

References

External links 
 Power Systems (Power Systems for UNIX, and Linux Clients) – IBM.com
 IBM Power Systems Redbooks
 It's Official: Now We're Power Systems and i for Business – ITjungle.com
 Hardware, OS Get New Names--And That's a Good Thing – IBM Systems Magazine.com
 IBM IT Infrastructure web page
 IBM Systems Power Systems Magazine

IBM server computers
AS/400
Computer-related introductions in 2008